San Marcos is a town and a municipality in the Carazo Department of Nicaragua. The municipality has a population of 33,147 (2021 estimate).

San Marcos' climate enables the production of coffee and a large variety of tropical flowers and fruits.

Religion
San Marcos' inhabitants are a Catholic majority, a heritage of the Spaniard Colonization. They are fervent followers of the Spaniard Catholic Traditions. For example, the most notorious festivity, where many people gather every year, is the celebration of their Patron San Marcos. San Marcos' Catholic Parish Church, in the middle of the town square, is a legacy of the Spaniard influence, as could be seen in its construction and designs.

Education

San Marcos is host to Keiser University-Latin American Campus, a campus of Keiser University (headquartered in Fort Lauderdale, Florida, USA), giving San Marcos the prestige of a University City. Keiser University Latin American Campus is perhaps the only U.S. accredited institution of higher education granting degrees in Nicaragua and most of the region. 20 years and more than 1,200 graduates after its founding (the campus in San Marcos was host to the University of Mobile (1993) and Ave Maria University (until July 2013), alumni from the Latin American Campus have gone on to work and study in graduate programs throughout the Americas, the United States and across the globe. They have set an international standard of professional and academic success. Receiving students from all over Central America and the United States, Keiser University Latin American Campus occupies the building where the famous Normal de Señoritas Salvadora de Somoza was located.  This was an institution that educated young girls to become elementary school teachers.  It was also the host of students from all over the country and Central America. The campus encompasses over 740,000 square feet including green areas and athletic field. It has 23 classrooms, a library and auditorium, campus dining facilities, modern computer and science laboratories, spacious dormitories, faculty offices, fitness center, administrative buildings, student services building, conference center, and a 300-person chapel, La Purísima.

Notable people from San Marcos 
San Marcos is the birthplace of Clodomiro Picado Twight (1887–1944), a Pasteur Institute scientist whose work on molds was a precursor to the formal discovery of penicillin.

Anastasio Somoza García (1 February 1896 – 29 September 1956) was the leader of Nicaragua from 1937 until his assassination in 1956. He was only officially the 21st President of Nicaragua from 1 January 1937 to 1 May 1947 and from 21 May 1950 until his assassination on 29 September 1956, ruling for the rest of the time as an unelected military strongman.[1] He was the patriarch of the Somoza family, which ruled Nicaragua as a family dictatorship for 42 years.

Twin towns – sister cities

San Marcos is twinned with:
 Biel/Bienne, Switzerland
 Helmond, Netherlands
 Jena, Germany

References

Municipalities of the Carazo Department